LinuxTLE is a Thai Linux distribution based on  Ubuntu and developed by the Thailand National Electronics and Computer Technology Center (NECTEC).

TLE stands for Thai Language Extension, as it was originally a Thai extension for Red Hat Linux. The pronunciation "talay" is a homophone of the Thai word ทะเล (the sea).

Version history
Various versions have been released from June 1999 to August 2011.

References

External links 
 OpenTLE/LinuxTLE website (Thai)
 DistroWatch Weekly, Issue 79, 13 December 2004 (Featured distribution of the week)
 

Ubuntu derivatives
Language-specific Linux distributions
State-sponsored Linux distributions
Linux distributions